Serpong is a district and a sub-district located in South Tangerang, Banten Province, Indonesia. Before South Tangerang City became an autonomous city, Serpong was one of the sub-districts of Tangerang Regency.

Administrative Borders

Subdistricts
Serpong district is divided into 9 sub-districts: 
 Buaran
 Ciater
 Cilenggang
 Lengkong Gudang
 East Lengkong Gudang
 Lengkong Wetan
 Rawa Buntu
 Mekar Jaya
 Serpong

History
Serpong was originally a rubber plantation, it has now been developed as an elite area. Dozens of entertainment venues, malls, and crowded centers have sprung up in Serpong. BSD City is located within this district.

Education

Tertiary Education
International University Liaison Indonesia (IULI)
Indonesian Institute of Technology

Transportation
Serpong is mainly served by land-based transportation, with buses, taxibus and taxis. The public transportation mainly goes to Jakarta since many residents from Serpong commute to Jakarta on daily basis. The district is served by KRL Commuterline through Rawa Buntu railway station and Serpong railway station. Serpong is serviced by these toll roads:
 Jakarta–Serpong Toll Road
Serpong–Balaraja Toll Road (planned)
 Jakarta–Tangerang Toll Road
 Cengkareng–Batu Ceper–Kunciran Toll Road (Jakarta Outer Ring Road 2)
After the construction of Cengkareng–Batu Ceper–Kunciran Toll Road, Serpong is now directly connected with Soekarno-Hatta International Airport.

See also
South Tangerang
List of districts of Banten
Districts of Indonesia

References

South Tangerang
Districts of Indonesia
Banten
Districts of Banten

External Links
 Official Website
 SerpongCity.Com - Media Informasi & Interaksi Komunitas Kawasan Serpong